Geoffrey "Geoff" Tulloch (birth registered third ¼ 1929) is an English former professional rugby league footballer who played in the 1950s.

Background
Geoff Tulloch's birth was registered in Sculcoates district, East Riding of Yorkshire, England, he is the grandson of the rugby union and rugby league footballer who played for Hull Kingston Rovers in the 1890s; H. Tulloch/H. Tullock.

Playing career

International honours
Geoff Tulloch won a cap for England while at Hull Kingston Rovers in 1951 against Wales.

County honours
Geoff Tulloch won cap(s) for Yorkshire while at Hull Kingston Rovers in 1951/52 against Cumberland.

Note
Tulloch's surname is variously spelt "correctly" with an "h" as Tulloch, or "incorrectly" with a "k" as Tullock.

References

1929 births
Living people
England national rugby league team players
English people of Scottish descent
English rugby league players
Hull Kingston Rovers players
People from Sculcoates
Rugby league players from Kingston upon Hull
Rugby league wingers
Yorkshire rugby league team players